Fluminicola is a genus of minute freshwater snails with an operculum, aquatic gastropod molluscs or micromolluscs in the family Lithoglyphidae.

Species
Species within the genus Fluminicola include:
Fluminicola avernalis Pilsbry, 1935 - Moapa pebblesnail
Fluminicola coloradoensis Morrison, 1940 - Green River pebblesnail
Fluminicola columbiana Hemphill, 1899 - Columbia pebblesnail
Fluminicola dalli (Call, 1884) - Pyramid Lake pebblesnail
Fluminicola erythopoma Pilsbry, 1899 - ash meadows pebblesnail
Fluminicola fuscus (Haldeman, 1847) - ashy pebblesnail
Fluminicola hindsi (Baird, 1863) - vagrant pebblesnail
Fluminicola merriami (Pilsbry & Beecher, 1892) - pahranagat pebblesnail
Fluminicola minutissimus Pilsbry, 1907 - pixie pebblesnail
Fluminicola modoci Hannibal, 1912 - Modoc pebblesnail
Fluminicola nevadensis Walker, 1916 - cortez hills pebblesnail
Fluminicola nuttallianus (I. Lea, 1838) - dusky pebblesnail, type species
Fluminicola seminalis (Hinds, 1842) - nugget pebblesnail
Fluminicola tenuis Pilsbry
Fluminicola turbiniformis (Tryon, 1865) - turban pebblesnail
Fluminicola virens (I. Lea, 1838) - Olympia pebblesnail

References

External links 
 Hershler R. (1999). "A systematic review of the hydrobiid snails (Gastropoda: Rissoidea) of the Great Basin, western United States. Part II. Genera Colligyrus, Fluminicola, Pristinicola, and Tryonia". The Veliger 42(4): 306-337. PDF .
 Hershler R., Liu H.-P., Frest T. J. & Johannes E. J. (2007). "Extensive diversification of pebblesnails (Lithoglyphidae: Fluminicola) in the upper Sacramento River basin". Zoological Journal of the Linnean Society 149(3): 371-422. , PDF.

Lithoglyphidae
Taxa named by William Stimpson
Taxonomy articles created by Polbot
Gastropod genera